The Sino-Ryukyuan Cultural and Economic Association is an organization promoting cultural and economic exchange between Taiwan and Okinawa Prefecture, Japan.

History 

The Sino-Ryukyuan Cultural and Economic Association was founded in 1958 by Fang Chih in an effort by the Republic of China to foster cultural and economic ties between the people of Taiwan and the people of Ryukyu-Okinawa. It had an  office in Naha acting as the representative office of Taiwan. In 2006, the office was changed into a Taipei Economic and Cultural Office.

In 2012, Chairwoman Tsai Hsueh-ni was presented with the Order of the Rising Sun by the Japanese government in recognition of her social welfare exchange contributions between Japan and Taiwan.

List of chairmen

References 

Politics of Taiwan
Japan–Taiwan relations
Organizations established in 1958
1958 establishments in Taiwan